The AIDS Activities Coordinating Office (AACO) is a part of the Philadelphia Department of Public Health. It collects and reports epidemiological data, and oversees the AIDS service organizations which provide the bulk of medical case management for people infected with HIV. AACO administers federal, state and city funded HIV/AIDS core treatment and prevention programs in Philadelphia. The office also coordinates HIV/AIDS planning, and conducts HIV education and training.

About

History
AACO was established by Mayor W. Wilson Goode in 1987 to manage the city's growing AIDS epidemic and the numerous community organizations that emerged to fight the disease. David Fair, a well-known local activist and union leader, was tapped as the agency's first director.

Services
AACO conducts and publishes epidemiological activities, organizes trainings for people in the field of HIV/AIDS prevention and treatment, and coordinates local HIV/AIDS planning.

The agency runs an information hotline, which is manned by specialists who answer questions about HIV-related topics, make referrals to medical case management, and other free services for people living with HIV and those at risk of infection. The hotline also records complaints about HIV services.

AACO funds local AIDS service organizations including:
 ActionAIDS
 Mazzoni Center
 Philadelphia FIGHT
 Prevention Point Philadelphia

References

External links
 AIDS Activities Coordinating Office of Philadelphia
 Philadelphia Department of Public Health

HIV/AIDS prevention organizations
Government of Philadelphia
Organizations based in Philadelphia